Big Time Vaudeville was a series of black-and-white 9- to 10-minute short films resembling the Vitaphone Varieties and also produced by Warner Brothers and Vitaphone (at the Brooklyn studios in New York). These consisted of four to six vaudeville acts and are historically interesting with many performers rarely seen on film.

Overview

In 1934, Warner Bros. released four Pepper Pots titled “Vaudeville Reel” that featured several acrobatic acts, dancers, singers and comedians appearing on a stage, much like a vaudeville show. Their success prompted the studio to fashion a new series using the same set-up.

Since few of the performers appearing in these became household names, they were seldom reissued after their initial run and were rarely seen on television. The more familiar performers also appeared in other Vitaphone-Warner shorts, including the eccentric Chaz Chase, Eddie Peabody and a pre-radio Edgar Bergen. The latter starred in the most frequently shown today title, Bring on the Girls, with both he and “dummy” Charlie McCarthy commenting on the different acts.

List of titles

A listing of titles, with Joseph Henabery handling several as director, and Samuel Sax producing:

See also
Vitaphone Varieties
List of short subjects by Hollywood studio#Warner Brothers

References
 
 Motion Pictures 1912-1939 Catalog of Copyright Entries 1951 Library of Congress 
BoxOffice back issue scans available (release date information in multiple issue “Shorts Charts”)

Notes

Vitaphone short films
Warner Bros. short films
American black-and-white films